Louis R. Loeffler (February 24, 1897 – April 22, 1972) was an American film editor. Through his five-decade career, he worked on over 100 films, including In Old Arizona (1928), Hotel for Women (1939), In the Meantime, Darling (1944), Laura (1944), The Iron Curtain (1948), How to Marry a Millionaire (1953), River of No Return (1954), and Anatomy of a Murder (1959). He was nominated for two Academy Awards for film editing in 1960 and 1963 for the films Anatomy of a Murder and The Cardinal, respectively.

External links 
 

1897 births
1972 deaths
American film editors
Burials at Westwood Village Memorial Park Cemetery